Relais & Châteaux is an association of individually owned and operated luxury hotels and restaurants. The group currently has about 580 members in 68 countries on five continents. Predominantly represented in Europe, the association is growing in North America, Asia and Africa. The current president is Laurent Gardinier.

History and attributes
The association was established in France in 1954.

The group is known for its strict admission standards. In addition to luxurious facilities, members must have special features distinguishing them from chain hotels. Most of them are historic landmarks such as castles, manor houses, or townhouses in idyllic settings and offering exquisite haute cuisine.  

Prospective and current members are evaluated by the group's traditional "five C" motto: "Caractère, Courtoisie, Calme, Charme et Cuisine" (Character, Courtesy, Calm, Charm and Cuisine).

Presidents
2023-present: Laurent Gardinier
2013–2022: Philippe Gombert
2005–2013: Jaume Tapies
1986–2005: Régis Bulot
1971–1986: Joseph Olivereau

References

External links
Relais & Châteaux website
Relais & Châteaux - About Us 
Relais & Châteaux Africa

Hotel affiliation groups
1954 establishments in France